Jean-Jacques Challet-Venel (11 May 1811, Geneva – 6 August 1893) was a Swiss politician and member of the Swiss Federal Council (1864–1872).

Challet was elected to the Federal Council of Switzerland on 12 July 1864 as the first member from the Canton of Geneva. He handed over office on 31 December 1872 after being voted out of office. He was affiliated with the Free Democratic Party of Switzerland. During his time in office he held the following departments:
Department of Finance (1864–1867)
Department of Posts (1868)
Department of Finance (1869)
Department of Posts (1870–1872)

References

External links

1811 births
1893 deaths
Politicians from Geneva
Swiss Calvinist and Reformed Christians
Free Democratic Party of Switzerland politicians
Members of the Federal Council (Switzerland)
Finance ministers of Switzerland
Members of the National Council (Switzerland)